Conoplectus acornus is a species of beetles, first discovered by Christopher E. Carlton in 1983. No sub-species mentioned in the Catalogue of Life.

References

Pselaphinae